Noko Alice Matlou (born 30 September 1985) is a South African professional soccer player who plays as a defender for Spanish Primera Federación side SD Eibar. She has represented the South Africa women's national team both as a striker and a defender. In 2008, Matlou became the first South African to be named African Women's Footballer of the Year.

Career

Club
At a club level, she plays for MaIndies. She has previously played for Development Ladies, Brazilian Ladies and the University of Johannesburg. Within footballing circles, she is nicknamed "Beep-Beep". Matlou trains with male footballers to enhance her game: "I train regularly with local male clubs and when I get on to the field with the women they simply cannot touch me."

International
Matlou made her debut for South Africa women's national football team ("Banyana Banyana") in December 2006. In September 2009, Matlou was subjected to a gender "inspection" by a referee in the presence of the opposition captain, before South Africa's match against Ghana at Caledonian Stadium, Pretoria. She was allowed to play in the match after being confirmed as female.

Matlou came to prominence within the national team by scoring six goals at the 2008 African Women's Championship. She has been selected for the squads for a variety of tournaments, including at the 2012 Summer Olympics in London, United Kingdom. In 2014, South Africa's coach Vera Pauw deployed Matlou—previously a striker, as a defender.

Awards
In 2008, she became the first South African to be named African Women's Footballer of the Year by the Confederation of African Football.

References

External links
 Noko Matlou at BDFútbol
 
 

1985 births
Living people
People from Capricorn District Municipality
Sportspeople from Limpopo
South African women's soccer players
Women's association football forwards
SD Eibar Femenino players
Primera División (women) players
South Africa women's international soccer players
2019 FIFA Women's World Cup players
Olympic soccer players of South Africa
Footballers at the 2012 Summer Olympics
Footballers at the 2016 Summer Olympics
African Women's Footballer of the Year winners
FIFA Century Club
South African expatriate soccer players
South African expatriate sportspeople in Spain
Expatriate women's footballers in Spain
Primera Federación (women) players